Star Bright is an album by Jamaican-born jazz trumpeter Dizzy Reece, featuring performances recorded in 1959 shortly after his move to New York City and released on the Blue Note label. So far, it has been released on CD only in Japan.

Reception

The Allmusic review awarded the album 4½ stars.

Track listing
All compositions by Dizzy Reece except as indicated

 "The Rake" - 6:06
 "I'll Close My Eyes" (Kaye, Reid) - 5:57
 "Groovesville" - 8:08
 "The Rebound" - 6:48
 "I Wished on the Moon" (Dorothy Parker, Ralph Rainger) - 6:51
 "A Variation on Monk" - 5:41

Personnel
Dizzy Reece - trumpet
Hank Mobley - tenor saxophone
Wynton Kelly - piano
Paul Chambers - bass
Art Taylor - drums

References

Blue Note Records albums
Dizzy Reece albums
1960 albums
Albums recorded at Van Gelder Studio